Voskresensky District is an administrative district (raion), one of the forty in Nizhny Novgorod Oblast, Russia. Municipally, it is incorporated as Voskresensky Municipal District. It is located in the east of the oblast. Its administrative center is the urban locality (a work settlement) of Voskresenskoye. Population: 21,645 (2010 Census);  The population of Voskresenskoye accounts for 28.6% of the district's total population.

History
The district was established in 1929.

References

Notes

Sources

Districts of Nizhny Novgorod Oblast
States and territories established in 1929
 
